The East Africa cricket team was a cricket team representing Kenya, Uganda, Tanzania and Zambia. Their first game was against a South African Non-European team in 1958, and they appeared in the 1975 World Cup. East Africa was an Associate Member of the ICC from 1966 to 1989, after which its place was taken by East and Central Africa.

Cricket World Cup Record

World Cup Record (By Team)

1975 Cricket World Cup

East Africa qualified for the first Cricket World Cup in 1975, and were drawn against hosts England, India and New Zealand. They lost all three matches, and failed to qualify for the Knockout stage.

References

East Africa in international cricket
History of the Cricket World Cup